Haplogroup Q-NWT01 is a subclade of Y-DNA Haplogroup Q-MEH2. Haplogroup Q-NWT01 is defined by the presence of the NWT01 Single Nucleotide Polymorphism (SNP).

Distribution 
Q-NWT01 has descendants in the Northwest Territories of modern Canada. It was in these populations that it was discovered.

The Americas
Q-NWT01 is present in pre-Columbian populations in the Canadian Northwest. It also has been found in a specimen of the Saqqaq culture of prehistoric Greenland.

Asia
Because few samples from Asia have been tested for this lineage, its frequency there is uncertain. However, haplogroup Q-M120 is spread widely in Asia, from Azerbaijan and Kalmykia in the west to Japan in the east and from Mongolia in the north to Brunei in the south, and the entire Q-M120 clade has been determined to be a subclade of Q-NWT01. In addition, Y-DNA that belongs to the Q-B143 subclade like the Saqqaq specimen from Greenland has been found in Koryaks.

Associated SNPs 
Q-NWT01 is currently defined by only the NWT01 SNP. As part of the National Geographic Geno 2.0 test, this SNP is labeled F746. This is because it was independently discovered in a Q-M120 sample sequenced with next generation technology. It can also be called PR4083 as it was labeled in a primate sample sequenced at Family Tree DNA's Genomic Research Center.

See also
Human Y-chromosome DNA haplogroup

Y-DNA Q-M242 subclades

Y-DNA backbone tree

References

External links 
The Y-DNA Haplogroup Q Project

Q-NWT01
Inuvialuit